Canna amabilis is a species of herb in the family Cannaceae. It is native to Northern Argentina (Chaco Province).

It is a perennial and is hardy to zone 10 and is frost tender. In the north latitudes it is in flower from August to October, and the seeds ripen in October. The flowers are hermaphrodite.

See also
 Canna
 List of Canna species
 List of Canna cultivars

References

External links
 Kew Gardens Checklists
 Science Links Japan

amabilis